Si Sar (also Romanized as Sī Sar and Sīser; also known as Seh Sīr and Sisir) is a village in Gavork-e Sardasht Rural District of the Central District of Sardasht County, West Azerbaijan province, Iran. At the 2006 National Census, its population was 915 in 146 households. The following census in 2011 counted 792 people in 204 households. The latest census in 2016 showed a population of 641 people in 148 households; it was the largest village in its rural district.

References 

Sardasht County

Populated places in West Azerbaijan Province

Populated places in Sardasht County